Agata Barańska (born 23 December 1993) is a Polish former tennis player.

On 11 June 2012, she reached her best doubles ranking of world No. 461. In her career, she won four doubles titles at tournaments of the ITF Circuit. She is a Polish national champion in singles and doubles, as well as in mixed doubles.

Barańska made her WTA Tour main-draw debut at the 2015 Internationaux de Strasbourg in the doubles draw, partnering with Victoria Muntean.

ITF Circuit finals

Doubles: 9 (4 titles, 5 runner-ups)

External links
 
 

1993 births
Living people
Polish female tennis players
Place of birth missing (living people)